American wire gauge (AWG), also known as the Brown & Sharpe wire gauge, is a logarithmic stepped standardized wire gauge system used since 1857, predominantly in North America, for the diameters of round, solid, nonferrous, electrically conducting wire. Dimensions of the wires are given in ASTM standard B 258. The cross-sectional area of each gauge is an important factor for determining its current-carrying ampacity.

Increasing gauge numbers denote decreasing wire diameters, which is similar to many other non-metric gauging systems such as British Standard Wire Gauge (SWG), but unlike IEC 60228, the metric wire-size standard used in most parts of the world. This gauge system originated in the number of drawing operations used to produce a given gauge of wire. Very fine wire (for example, 30 gauge) required more passes through the drawing dies than 0 gauge wire did. Manufacturers of wire formerly had proprietary wire gauge systems; the development of standardized wire gauges rationalized selection of wire for a particular purpose.

The AWG tables are for a single, solid and round conductor. The AWG of a stranded wire is determined by the cross-sectional area of the equivalent solid conductor. Because there are also small gaps between the strands, a stranded wire will always have a slightly larger overall diameter than a solid wire with the same AWG.

AWG is also commonly used to specify body piercing jewelry sizes (especially smaller sizes), even when the material is not metallic.

Formulas
By definition,  is 0.005 inches in diameter, and Nr. 0000 is 0.46 inches in diameter, or nearly half-an-inch. The ratio of these diameters is 1:92, and there are 40  gauge sizes from the smallest  to the largest , or 39 steps. Each successive gauge number decreases the wire diameter by a constant factor.

The diameter of an  wire is determined according to the following formula:

See rule below.)

or equivalently:

The gauge number can be calculated from the diameter using the following formulas:

Step 1 Calculate the ratio  of the wire's diameter  to the standard gauge ( #36 )

Step 2  Calculate the American wire gauge number  using any convenient logarithm; pick any one of the following expressions in the last two columns of formulas to calculate ; notice that they differ in the choice of base of the logarithm, but otherwise are identical:

In general, the calculation can be done using any base  strictly greater than zero.
and the cross-section area is

The standard ASTM B258-02 defines the ratio between successive sizes to be the 39th root of 92, or approximately 1.1229322. ASTM B258-02 also dictates that wire diameters should be tabulated with no more than 4 significant figures, with a resolution of no more than 0.0001 inches (0.1 mils) for wires larger than Nr. 44 , and 0.00001 inches (0.01 mils) for wires Nr. 45  and smaller.

Large  wires have gauge sizes denoted by multiple zeros – 0, 00, 000, and 0000 – the more zeros, the larger the wire, starting with  0. In that case the gauge number  is zero, it's taken as-is. If  is a negative number, the gauge number  is notated by multiple zeros, up to just under a half-inch; beyond that point, the “wire” may instead considered a copper bar or rod. The gauge can be denoted either using the long form with several zeros or the short form  "/0" called gauge "number of zeros/0" notation. For example 4/0 is short for  0000. For any  /0 wire, use the number of zeros    and similarly    in the above formulas. For instance, for  0000 or 4/0, use

Rules of thumb
 When the cross-sectional area of a wire is doubled, the AWG will decrease by 3 . (E.g. two  Nr. 14  wires have about the same cross-sectional area as a single  nr. 11 wire.)  This doubles the conductance.
 When the diameter of a wire is doubled, the  will decrease by 6 . (E.g.  nr. 2 is about twice the diameter of  nr. 8 .)  This quadruples the cross-sectional area and the conductance.

A decrease of ten gauge numbers, for example from nr. 12 to nr. 2, multiplies the area and weight by approximately 10, and reduces the electrical resistance (and increases the conductance) by a factor of approximately 10.

For the same cross section, aluminum wire has a conductivity of approximately 61% of copper, so an aluminum wire has nearly the same resistance as a copper wire smaller by 2  sizes, which has 62.9% of the area.

Tables of AWG wire sizes
The table below shows various data including both the resistance of the various wire gauges and the allowable current (ampacity) based on a copper conductor with plastic insulation.  The diameter information in the table applies to solid wires.  Stranded wires are calculated by calculating the equivalent cross sectional copper area.  Fusing current (melting wire) is estimated based on  ambient temperature.  The table below assumes DC, or AC frequencies equal to or less than 60 Hz, and does not take skin effect into account.  "Turns of wire per unit length" is the reciprocal of the conductor diameter; it is therefore an upper limit for wire wound in the form of a helix (see solenoid), based on uninsulated wire.

In the North American electrical industry, conductors larger than 4/0 AWG are generally identified by the area in thousands of circular mils (kcmil), where 1 kcmil = 0.5067 mm2. The next wire size larger than 4/0 has a cross section of 250 kcmil. A circular mil is the area of a wire one mil in diameter. One million circular mils is the area of a circle with 1,000 mil (1 inch) diameter. An older abbreviation for one thousand circular mils is MCM.

Stranded wire AWG sizes
AWG gauges are also used to describe stranded wire. The AWG gauge of a stranded wire represents the sum of the cross-sectional areas of the individual strands; the gaps between strands are not counted. When made with circular strands, these gaps occupy about 25% of the wire area, thus requiring the overall bundle diameter to be about 13% larger than a solid wire of equal gauge.

Stranded wires are specified with three numbers, the overall AWG size, the number of strands, and the AWG size of a strand. The number of strands and the AWG of a strand are separated by a slash. For example, a 22 AWG 7/30 stranded wire is a 22 AWG wire made from seven strands of 30 AWG wire.

As indicated in the Formulas and Rules of Thumb sections above, differences in AWG translate directly into ratios of diameter or area. This property can be employed to easily find the AWG of a stranded bundle by measuring the diameter and count of its strands. (This only applies to bundles with circular strands of identical size.) To find the AWG of 7-strand wire with equal strands, subtract 8.4 from the AWG of a strand. Similarly, for 19-strand subtract 12.7, and for 37 subtract 15.6. See the Mathcad worksheet illustration of this straightforward application of the formula. 

Measuring strand diameter is often easier and more accurate than attempting to measure bundle diameter and packing ratio. Such measurement can be done with a wire gauge go-no-go tool such as a Starrett 281 or Mitutoyo 950–202, or with a caliper or micrometer.

See also
IEC 60228, international standards for wire sizes
French gauge
Brown & Sharpe
Circular mil, North American Electrical industry standard for wires larger than 4/0.
Birmingham Wire Gauge
Stubs Iron Wire Gauge
Jewelry wire gauge
Body jewelry sizes
Electrical wiring
Number 8 wire, a term used in the New Zealand vernacular

References

Wire gauges
Customary units of measurement in the United States